The Molonglo River is a perennial river that is part of the Murrumbidgee catchment within the Murray–Darling basin. It is located in the Monaro and Capital Country regions of New South Wales and the Australian Capital Territory, in Australia.

Location and features
The river then flows to its confluence with the Murrumbidgee River, near Uriarra Crossing. Over its  course, the Molonglo River alternates several times between long broad floodplains and narrow rocky gorges. One of the floodplains is called the Molonglo Plain.

Etymology

The river's name was recorded as the  "Yeal-am-bid-gie" in 1820 by the explorer Charles Throsby. This was probably the collective local Moolinggolah name for the river. (The suffix "bidgee" was common in Aboriginal languages for rivers in the Canberra area and presumably means "water" or "river".) The Moolinggolah people of the district around Captains Flat probably gave the Molonglo its name.  Where the river flowed through what is now Canberra, it was probably known after the Ngambri people, transcribed as Kembury, Canberry, and other transcription variations. The word molongolo is derived from an Aboriginal word meaning "like the sound of thunder".

History

The first name given to the River by Westerners was Limestone River, Subsequently, in the early years of European settlement both the Molonglo and the Queanbeyan were known as the "Fish River" for the abundance of native fish in them.  The Molonglo was renowned as a beautiful river with excellent fishing for native Murray cod, Macquarie perch and silver perch.  This abundance of native fish did not last.  Upon commencement of mining operations at Captains Flat (and contrary to NSW Government assurances), mine tailings continually severely polluted the river, including several mass tailings collapses into the river between the 1930s and 1950s, eradicating all native fish and most other aquatic life downstream from the site.  Despite government funded rehabilitation programs in 1976, some toxic leachates still enter the river from the Captain's Flat mine site.

Consequently, when Lake Burley Griffin was built upon the Molonglo and filled in 1964, the waters were devoid of native fish. Restocking commenced in the 1970s and continued through 1980s have re-established Murray Cod and Golden Perch in the lake and a short stretch of river upstream.  A large stretch of the Molonglo still holds nothing but introduced fish species and is still waiting for the native fish species to be re-established by stockings.

Current

Significant natural restoration work has been undertaken downstream of Scrivener Dam in conjunction with the housing development in the Molonglo Valley during the 2010s.

See also

 History of Lake Burley Griffin
 List of rivers of Australia
 London Bridge (New South Wales)
 Rivers of New South Wales
 Scott's Crossing Road

Selected references

External links

 
 

Rivers of the Australian Capital Territory
Rivers of New South Wales
Tributaries of the Murrumbidgee River
Borders of the Australian Capital Territory